The Messinese is an indigenous breed of domestic goat from the area of the Monti Nebrodi and the Monti Peloritani in the province of Messina, in the Mediterranean island of Sicily, in southern Italy. It is raised mainly in those areas, but also in the provinces of Catania, Enna and Palermo. Its range partly overlaps that of the Argentata dell'Etna. The breed was officially recognised and a herd-book established in 2001. It was previously known either as the Capra dei Nebrodi (in that area) or in general as the Siciliana Comune.

The Messinese is one of the forty-three autochthonous Italian goat breeds of limited distribution for which a herdbook is kept by the Associazione Nazionale della Pastorizia, the Italian national association of sheep- and goat-breeders. At the end of 2013 the registered population was variously reported as 9814 and as 10,409; the total population is estimated at 42,000.

Use

The milk averages 5.83% fat and 4.13% protein, and is used mostly to make caprino and mixed-milk cheeses.

References

Goat breeds
Dairy goat breeds
Goat breeds originating in Italy